Franco Bertinetti (14 July 1923 – 6 March 1995) was an Italian fencer. He won a gold medal in the team épée events at the 1952 and 1956 Summer Olympics.

References

External links
 

1923 births
1995 deaths
Italian male fencers
Olympic fencers of Italy
Fencers at the 1952 Summer Olympics
Fencers at the 1956 Summer Olympics
Olympic gold medalists for Italy
Olympic medalists in fencing
People from Vercelli
Medalists at the 1952 Summer Olympics
Medalists at the 1956 Summer Olympics
Sportspeople from the Province of Vercelli